Jelica (Serbian Cyrillic: Јелица) is a mountain in central Serbia, near the town of Čačak. Its highest peak, Crna Stena, has an elevation of 929 meters above sea level.

Gradina on Jelica is an archaeological site, with the remains of a fortified settlement. The oldest artefacts found date from the 7th century BC.

References

Mountains of Serbia